Petrophile acicularis is a species of flowering plant in the family Proteaceae and is endemic to southwestern Western Australia. It is a low, tufted shrub with cylindrical leaves and oval heads of densely hairy, cream-coloured flowers.

Description
This petrophile differs from similar species in having prominently striated cone scales.

Taxonomy
Petrophile acicularis was first formally described in 1810 by Robert Brown in Transactions of the Linnean Society of London. The specific epithet (acicularis) means "needle-pointed", referring to the leaves.

Distribution and habitat
This petrophile usually grows in sand and is found between the Scott River, Two Peoples Bay and Manjimup in the Jarrah Forest and  Warren biogeographic regions in the south-west of Western Australia.

Conservation status
Petrophile acicularis is classified as "not threatened" by the Western Australian Government Department of Parks and Wildlife.

References 

acicularis
Eudicots of Western Australia
Endemic flora of Western Australia
Plants described in 1810
Taxa named by Robert Brown (botanist, born 1773)